Muirfield Reef is a small reef located southwest of the Cocos (Keeling) Islands in the Indian Ocean.

Latitude -13.23296 Longitude 96.07260

See also
Muirfield Seamount

References

Landforms of the Cocos (Keeling) Islands
Reefs of Australia